Anillopsidius is a genus of ground beetles in the family Carabidae. This genus has a single species, Anillopsidius atlasicus.

References

Trechinae
Monotypic Carabidae genera